The Chorus Lady is a 1915 American comedy silent film directed by Frank Reicher. The screenplay was by Marion Fairfax and James Forbes. The film stars Cleo Ridgely, Marjorie Daw, Wallace Reid, Richard Grey and Mrs. Lewis McCord.

It is based on a book and play of the same name, written in 1906 by James Forbes, written in 1906 for Rose Stahl.

The film was released on October 18, 1915, by Paramount Pictures. It was remade in 1924 by Ralph Ince.

Plot

Patricia O'Brian is engaged to Danny Mallory, a detective whose ambition is to own a farm and leave the Broadway life for the countryside. Patricia, on the other hand, is a chorus girl and, knowing the theater environment, tries to keep Nora, her younger sister, away from her. The girl, with a head full of crickets for the celebrity world, attracts the attention of Dicky Crawford, a patron of the womanizing arts who gets her a part in a show. Nora falls in love and Patricia tries to distract Crawford's interest from her sister by flirting with him. During the dress rehearsal, Patricia is chosen to replace the first sick actress. But, while in the dressing room, he sees a note that Nora is preparing to go to Crawford's apartment. Half dressed, he rushes to stop her, leaving the theater as he is, throwing on only a coat over the petticoat. At Crawford's house, the man tells her he is only interested in her. The two, however, are surprised by Danny who, working as an investigator for Crawford's wife, is looking for evidence to nail the man so that his wife can get a divorce. Having found his girlfriend wearing only underwear under her coat, Danny doesn't want to hear Patricia's protests of innocence. Only later, when Pat is about to be evicted, do the two manage to talk and clarify. Reconciled, they marry, moving to the countryside with Nora and her new boyfriend, a young stage assistant in love with her.

Cast 
Cleo Ridgely as Patricia O'Brian
Marjorie Daw as Nora O'Brian
Wallace Reid as Danny Mallory
Richard Grey as Dicky Crawford
Mrs. Lewis McCord as Landlady

Preservation status
The film is now lost.

References

External links 
 

1915 films
1910s English-language films
Silent American comedy films
1915 comedy films
Paramount Pictures films
American black-and-white films
Lost American films
American silent feature films
Lost comedy films
Films directed by Frank Reicher
1910s American films